The City of Maroondah is a local government area in Victoria, Australia in the eastern suburbs of Melbourne. Maroondah had a population of 117,498 in June 2018.

The City of Maroondah was created through the amalgamation the former Cities of Ringwood and Croydon in December 1994. The name 'Maroondah' was taken from two Aboriginal words - meaning "throwing" and "leaf" - symbolising the green environment.

Suburbs located in the City include Ringwood, Croydon, Heathmont, Ringwood East, Ringwood North, Warranwood, Croydon North, Croydon South, Croydon Hills, Bayswater North and parts of Kilsyth South, Vermont and Park Orchards.

The Lilydale and Belgrave railway lines run through the City of Maroondah, with stations at Heatherdale, Ringwood, Ringwood East, Croydon, and Heathmont. The Maroondah City Council is served by many buses operated by Ventura, Transdev, McKenzies and Vline.

Maroondah contracts JJ Richards for their garbage collection and have 3 bins. Blue lidded 240l bin for recycling, a Maroon lidded 240l bin for garden organics and a 120l all green bin for waste/landfill collection.

Education
Maroondah residents have a wide selection of excellent state and private schools that attract students from across the eastern suburbs of Melbourne.

Primary schools 

 Ainslie Parklands Primary School
 Bayswater North Primary School
 Croydon Hills Primary School
 Croydon Primary School
 Dorset Primary School
 Eastwood Primary School
 Good Shepherd Lutheran Primary School
 Great Ryrie Primary School
 Heathmont East Primary School
 Holy Spirit Community School
 Kalinda Primary School
 Marlborough Primary School
 Mullum Primary School
 Our Lady of Perpetual Help Primary School
 Ringwood Heights Primary School
 Ringwood North Primary School
 Ruskin Park Primary School
 Sacred Heart Primary School
 Tinternvale Primary School
 Village School
 Warranwood Primary School
 Yarra Road Primary School

Secondary schools 

 Aquinas College
 Croydon Community School
 Heathmont College
 Luther College
 Melba College
 Norwood Secondary College
 Ringwood Secondary College

Combined schools 

 Melbourne Rudolf Steiner School
 Tintern Grammer
 Yarra Valley Grammar

Special schools 

 Croydon Special Developmental School

Universities 

 Swinburne University of Technology - Croydon Campus

Ayrton Research & Technology - Ringwood Campus

Townships and localities
The 2021 census, the city had a population of 115,043 up from 110,376 in the 2016 census

^ - Territory divided with another LGA

Libraries
There are two libraries located in the Maroondah region, both managed by Eastern Regional Libraries.

Croydon Library - Civic Square, Mount Dandenong Road, Croydon
 
Realm - Ringwood Town Square, 179 Maroondah Highway Ringwood (opposite Ringwood Station)

Councillors and wards
The City of Maroondah has nine wards, each electing a single member:

Shopping Centres
There are two main shopping precincts in Maroondah.

Eastland Shopping Centre - Ringwood

Croydon Central - Croydon

See also
 List of places on the Victorian Heritage Register in the City of Maroondah

References

External links
 
Official Maroondah City Council website
Public Transport Victoria local public transport map
Ringwood Community Garden - Selkirk Avenue, Wantirna
Link to Land Victoria interactive maps

Local government areas of Melbourne
Greater Melbourne (region)
 
Populated places established in 1994
1994 establishments in Australia